Tannenbaum is an unincorporated community in Cleburne County, Arkansas, United States. It shares a ZIP code 72530 with Drasco. Tannenbaum features chalet-like homes built on the northeast side of Greers Ferry Lake near Heber Springs. The community also has a boat dock and ramp, as well as recreational areas and an airfield.

References 

Unincorporated communities in Cleburne County, Arkansas
Unincorporated communities in Arkansas